Henry Montagu Villiers (4 January 1813 – 9 August 1861) was a British clergyman of the Church of England from the Villiers family.

Life
He was educated at Christ Church, Oxford, graduating M.A. in 1837, and became vicar of Kenilworth in that year rector of St. George's Church, Bloomsbury in 1841, and a canon of St Paul's Cathedral from 1847 to 1856. He was a Doctor of Divinity and Bishop of Carlisle in 1856, and Bishop of Durham from 1860 to 1861.

Family
He was the son of George Villiers and Theresa Parker, and grandson of the 1st Earl of Clarendon. He received a Royal Warrant of Precedence in 1839 entitling him to the rank of an earl's son.

Marriage
On 30 January 1837, he married Amelia Maria Hulton, daughter of William Hulton. They had at least 4 sons and 4 daughters:

Henry Montagu Villiers (13 November 1837 – 9 September 1908). Prebendary of St Paul's Cathedral. Married first Lady Victoria Russell, daughter of John Russell, 1st Earl Russell. Married secondly Charlotte Louisa Emily Cadogan, granddaughter of both George Cadogan, 3rd Earl Cadogan and Henry Paget, 1st Marquess of Anglesey
Charles Augustus Villiers, b. Apr 1839
Frederick Ernest Villiers (16 November 1840 – 14 October 1922), Major of the Hertfordshire Imperial Yeomanry cavalry force.
Amy Maria Villiers (b. 26 March 1842 – d. 20 October 1934), married Edward Cheese, a clergyman.
Gertrude Fanny Villiers (b. 19 August 1843 – d. 31 December 1906), married Berkeley Paget, a great-grandson of Henry Bayly Paget, 1st Earl of Uxbridge.
Wilbraham Edward Villiers (b. 2 August 1845)
Mary Agneta Villiers (b. 30 December 1846 – d. 22 May 1935), married James Hughes Cooper, a clergyman.
Evelyn Theresa Villiers (b. 23 August 1852 – d. 29 December 1943), married the Daniel J. Healy (born Hely-Hutchinson), an Irish naval officer and only son of Capt. Hon. John Healy (d. 1855) and grandson of John 3rd Earl of Donoughmore. They settled in Hampshire and had 3 sons, William, George and Patrick, and 2 daughters.

References

External links
Bibliographic directory from Project Canterbury
A listing of his descendants

1813 births
1861 deaths
Bishops of Carlisle
Bishops of Durham
Henry Villiers
19th-century Church of England bishops
Alumni of Christ Church, Oxford